Chihiro Sakamoto (born 4 March 1994) is a Japanese woman cricketer. She made her international debut at the 2013 ICC Women's World Twenty20 Qualifier. She was also the member of the national team in the 2014 Asian Games.

References

External links 
 
 Profile at CricHQ

1994 births
Living people
Japanese women cricketers
Cricketers at the 2014 Asian Games
Asian Games competitors for Japan
People from Tochigi, Tochigi